Kseniya Stankevich (born 28 January 1996) is a Belarusian freestyle wrestler. She is a two-time bronze medalist in the women's 50 kg event at the European Wrestling Championships.

Career 

She won one of the bronze medals in the women's 44 kg event at the 2015 World Junior Wrestling Championships held in Salvador da Bahia, Brazil.

At the 2020 European Wrestling Championships held in Rome, Italy, she won one of the bronze medals in the women's 50 kg event. She also won one of the bronze medals in the women's 50 kg event at the 2019 European Wrestling Championships held in Bucharest, Romania.

In 2019, at the Military World Games held in Wuhan, China, she won one of the bronze medals in the women's 50 kg event.

In 2022, she competed in the 50 kg event at the Yasar Dogu Tournament held in Istanbul, Turkey.

Achievements

References

External links 

 

Living people
1996 births
Place of birth missing (living people)
Belarusian female sport wrestlers
European Wrestling Championships medalists
21st-century Belarusian women